1.FK Nová Paka is a Czech football club located in Nová Paka in the Hradec Králové Region. As of 2021–22, it plays in 1.B Class, Group A of the Hradec Králové Region, which is the 7th tier of the Czech football system.

The club has taken part in the Czech Cup numerous times, reaching the second round in 2011–12.

References

External links
 Official website 

Football clubs in the Czech Republic
Association football clubs established in 1911
Hradec Králové Region